Adriano Zecca (April 11, 1923 – March 1983) was an Italian professional football player and coach.

He was born in Genoa and played for 4 seasons (100 games, 19 goals) in the Serie A for Modena F.C. and A.S. Roma.

Honours
 Italian Champion: 1945/46 (not officially considered a Serie A season).

1923 births
1983 deaths
Italian footballers
Serie A players
A.C. Reggiana 1919 players
U.C. Sampdoria players
Torino F.C. players
Modena F.C. players
Venezia F.C. players
A.S. Roma players
Hellas Verona F.C. players
S.S.C. Bari players
Italian football managers
Spezia Calcio managers
S.S.D. Sanremese Calcio players
Association football midfielders